The 1981 European Formula Two season was the fifteenth European Formula Two season and was contested over 12 rounds. The season started on 19 March and ended on 20 September. The Drivers' Championship was won by Englishman Geoff Lees.

Season review

-

Drivers' Championship

References

External links
 https://web.archive.org/web/20090509083733/http://www.motorracing-archive.com/Motor-Racing/Events/European-Formula-2-1981---1984

Formula Two
European Formula Two Championship seasons